The 2021–22 season is Anadolu Efes's 42nd season in the existence of the club. The team plays in the Basketball Super League and in the EuroLeague.

Players

Squad information

Depth chart

Squad changes for the 2021–2022 season

In

|}

Out

|}

Competitions

Results

Overview

Basketball Super League

League table

EuroLeague

League table

References

2021–22 EuroLeague by club
Anadolu Efes S.K. seasons
2021–22 in Turkish basketball by club